Crucifixion plaques are small early medieval sculptures with a central panel of the still alive but crucified Jesus surrounded by four smaller ancillary panels.  consisting.  of Stephaton and Longinus (the lance and sponge bearers) in the lower quadrants, and two hovering attendant angels in the quadrants above his arms. Notable examples are found in classical Roman (usually of ivory) and 8th to mid-12th century Irish Insular art. 

There are eight surviving Irish examples, although many more were produced. Each is of cast bronze or copper alloy, and based on their ornamentation and iconography, are mostly dated to between the late 9th and 12th centuries. Apart from one, they are all of openwork (ie the figures were formed from holes, piercings, or gaps punched into the metal). The group share similar size and geographical spread, with find spots ranging from the broad area between Clonmacnoise in County Offaly and Tynan, County Armagh. The plaques are all cast as single pieces and, with the exception of the late 7th or early 8th century Rinnegan Crucifixion Plaque, have a unifying border. It is thought that the format is based on similar designs from earlier illuminated gospels, including the Book of Kells and Southampton Psalter.

The borders contain cavities for holding nails or rivets (some of which survive), indicating that they were once attached to larger wooden or metal ecclesiastical objects, perhaps metal book shrines or other reliquaries, or wooden altars or crosses. This function is supported by similar designs found in a number of near contemporary stone high crosses, suggesting that they might have been a transitional work between stone high crosses and wooden processional crosses such as that found at Tully Lough.

Format 

The format is likely influenced by folios from early illuminated gospels, and it is likely that the craftsmen had copies of these at hand. Examples include folio 200r of the Book of Kells, f.38v from the Southampton Psalter, miniatures from the Irish Gospels of St. Gall, and Durham Gospels, and the spear-bearer on the c. 1026 cumdach for the Stowe Missal.

The plaques are generally made from bronze or copper alloy, with the Rinnegan plaque showing evidence of gilding that is now lost. Except from one badly damaged example which is solid, they all are built from openwork. They all consist of a central panel of the Crucifixion of Jesus, surrounded by four much smaller ancillary figures, with the lower two side panels showing the biblical figures of Stephaton (the sponge-bearer at The Crucifixion) and Longinus (the lance-bearer) at Christ's feet, and two  hovering attendant angels which are located one at either side of Christ's head. A number of plaques, including those from Rinnegan and Clonmacnoise, contain curvilinear Celtic designs, including spirals and interlace. The Clonmacnoise plaque contains two small crosses on either side of Christ's head.

The central figure of Christ is always far larger than the angels and saints. He is usually bearded and given open eyes, and apart from the Clonmacnoise plaque, his feet turned away from each other. In six of the works he is naked except for a loincloth; in the Rinnegan and Clonmacnoise plaques he is given a full-length long-sleeved garment decorated with interlace patterns. Earlier examples, such as the Rinnegan plaque, contain Ultimate La Tène designs. In some plaques, including that found in Cell Dalua, Christ wears a loin cloth or skirt, while in examples such as the Tynan plaque his garment ends above his knees.

The reverse of the panels are typically plain and unadorned and contain multiple rivet holes (some of which are still in place in the Clonmacnoise plaque), indicating that they were once attached to larger metal or wooden objects.

Dating and function
The absence of Viking-influenced animal or zoomorphic designs indicates that they were produced before the 11th century. While some archeologists suggest dating as late as the early 12th century, the consensus is that the majority originate from between 1000 and 1150. Against this, the Clonmacnoise plaque contains vegetative decorations reminiscent of the 11th-century Ringerike style of Viking art. The Clonmacnoise plaque is further linked to contemporary metal objects such as the Lismore Crozier, including its technical and stylistic approaches and the yet then use of the difficult to source silver inlay.

Although the plaque's intended functions are unknown, they were most likely built to decorate larger ecclesiastical objects such as cumdachs, stone or wooden altar frontals (antependiums) or processional or freestanding wooden crosses. This theory is supported by the number of similar mounds and inserts on contemporary or earlier altars and crosses. A similarly sized mount is positioned on the lower part of the 8th or 9th century Tully Lough Cross, while similar compositions can be found on, amongst others, the Ullard cross in County Kilkenny, the Cross of St. Columba and St. Patrick at the Abbey of Kells, the South Cross at Clonmacnoise, and a cross on Calf of Man island.

Harbison favours the idea that they were used as pax-plates (objects used for the Kiss of peace  during mass) given their wear around Christ's head which he speculates was because they were passed between members of the clergy and congregation to be kissed. He further suggested that the plaques were produced by a single workshop, a theory refuted in 2014 by Griffin Murray who points out both their geographical dispersion and provenance (although all seem to have been produced in or around Southern Ulster) and differences when analysed under x-ray fluorescence.

Surviving examples
In 1980, the art historian Peter Harbison grouped eight surviving crucifixion plaques as a type based on their format, shared iconography and presumed function. Of these, the provenance of three is known while five are unlocalised. All were rediscovered in the 19th and 20th centuries, having been buried or hidden since the early medieval period, most likely to keep them safe from attacking Vikings or native forces.

The surviving examples are:

Rinnegan plaque

The Rinnegan Plaque was found in the 19th century in a churchyard near Athlone and is dated to the late 7th or early 8th century. It is considered the earliest of the series based on the style of its curvilinear designs, spirals and interlace. It is much larger than the others, however the cross is barely discernible and does not have a frame. Two attendant angels hover above his arms to his immediate left and right, and representations of the Roman soldiers Stephaton (the sponge-bearer) and Longinus (the lance-bearer) at his feet.

The figures were achieved by hammering the bronze from behind, while the detail was added via engraving and repoussé. The band above Christ's head contains ribbon interlace, and as on his breast-plate, is decorated with interlocking c-shaped scrolls and spirals. It has suffered considerable damage, and would have been far more decorative when first produced. The shine on the copper is somewhat blunted, while much of the gilt has been lost, as is most of Christ's right arm The tunic at one time was lined with interlace and fretwork.

Clonmacnoise plaque

The Clonmacnoise Crucifixion Plaque dates from the late-10th or early-11 century. Christ's head and arms are outsized compared to the rest of his body, and he is clothed in a long garment reaching his knees, and smiling despite the nail-heads or puncture wounds in the palms of each of his hand incurred from the spears held by Stephaton and Longinus. The plaque contains a number of resemblances to a panel on a cross on the Calf of Man island off the southwest coast of the Isle of Man, in which Christ is depicted with a moustache, forked beard and long hair, similar to the cleric on one of the short sides on the Soiscél Molaisse. Acquired by the NMI in 1935.

The reverse is unadorned and contains eight nail-holes on the outer borders, indicating that it was built as an attachment to a larger metal or wooden object. Thus most art historians conclude that it likely had a secondary function, but it is unknown as to what the precise intention was; likely such plaques adorned book covers, stone altar frontals or wooden crosses.

Tynan plaque

A plaque found in 1844 near Tynan, County Armagh, dated to c. 1100, was earlier (and incorrectly) referred to as the Dungannon plaque and is also made from bronze. Compared to the earlier plaques the figures are in high relief (ie are more projected forward from the frame), while Christ's hands do not seem nailed to his cross.

He wears a loincloth whes rimes seem to intertwine with the forms of the saints below. The extremities of Stephaton and Longinus' hair and garments seem to merge into the form of the plaque's border. Like those on the Clonmacnoise Crucifixion Plaque, the faces of the main figures bear evidence of wear and tear, suggesting the objects may once have serve as paxes, objects passed around to be kissed during masses.

Others
 Plaque sometimes associated with the monastery at Cell Dalua (Killaloe), County Clare, dated to the 11th c. when the site was a power base for Brian Boru. 
 Four plaques of unknown provenance, including three dated to the 12th century at the NMI, and one in the British Museum (catalogue 1983,0701.1) from  Kilkenny dated to the 11th or 12th century
 A now lost plaque known only from a 19th-century watercolour reproduction.

References

Sources

 Hamlin, Ann; Haworth, R. G. "A Crucifixion Plaque Reprovenanced". The Journal of the Royal Society of Antiquaries of Ireland, volume 112, 1982.  
 Harbison, Peter. The Crucifixion in Irish Art. Columba Press, 2000. 
 Harbison, Peter. "A lost crucifixion plaque of Clonmacnoise type found in County Mayo". ̄Irish Midland Studies: essays in commemoration of N.W. English, Athlone, 1980
 Henry, Françoise. Irish art during the Viking Invasions (800–1020 A.D.). London: Methuen, 1967
 Johnson, Ruth. "Irish Crucifixion Plaques: Viking Age or Romanesque?". The Journal of the Royal Society of Antiquaries of Ireland, volume 128, 1998. 
 MacDermott, Máire. "An Openwork Crucifixion Plaque from Clonmacnoise". The Journal of the Royal Society of Antiquaries of Ireland, volume 84, No. 1, 1954. 
 Mitchell, G. Frank. "Foreign Influences and the Beginnings of Christian Art". In: Treasures of early Irish art, 1500 B.C. to 1500 A.D: From the collections of the National Museum of Ireland, Royal Irish Academy, Trinity College Dublin. NY: Metropolitan Museum of Art, 1977. 
 Moss, Rachel. Medieval c. 400—c. 1600: Art and Architecture of Ireland. London: Yale University Press, 2014. 
 Murray, Griffin. "Irish crucifixion plaques: a reassessment. In: Mullins, Juliet; Ni Ghradaigh, Jenifer (eds): Envisioning Christ on the Cross: Ireland and the Early Medieval West. University of Notre Dame: Thomas F.X. Noble, 2014
 Ó Floinn, Raghnal; Wallace, Patrick (eds). Treasures of the National Museum of Ireland: Irish Antiquities.  Dublin: National Museum of Ireland, 2002. 
 O'Toole, Fintan.  A History of Ireland in 100 Objects. Dublin: Royal Irish Academy, 2013.

External links

Rinnagan Crucifixion Plaque. A History of Ireland in 100 Objects, 2013. The Irish Times, National Museum of Ireland and Royal Irish Academy

Celtic art
Irish art
Medieval European metalwork objects